Forgotten Voices of the Great War is a collection of interviews with people who lived through the First World War.The book is part of the Imperial War Museum's oral archive.

In 1960, the Imperial War Museum began a momentous and important task. A team of academics, archivists and volunteers set about tracing WWI veterans and interviewing them at length in order to record the experiences of ordinary individuals in war. The IWM aural archive has become the most important archive of its kind in the world. Authors have occasionally been granted access to the vaults, but digesting the thousands of hours of footage is a monumental task. Author Max Arthur puts the interviews into chronological and campaign order, and provides some context about the events that surround the memories. The book includes testimonies from Harry Patch, Philip Neame, Horace Birks, Edmund Blunden, Douglas Wimberley, Mabel Lethbridge, Reginald Leonard Haine, Edward Spears, Godfrey Buxton, Henry Williamson, Tom Adlam, Cecil Arthur Lewis, Montagu Cleeve, Charles Carrington, Keith Officer and Norman Demuth.

Now, forty years on, the Imperial War Museum has at last given author Max Arthur and his team of researchers unlimited access to the complete WWI tapes. These are the forgotten voices of an entire generation of survivors of the Great War. The resulting book is an important and compelling history of WWI in the words of those who experienced it.

This book has also been dramatized for the stage by the playwright Malcolm McKay.

External links
 Forgotten Voices website
 Imperial War Museum website
 

2002 non-fiction books
Personal accounts of World War I
History books about World War I
Oral history books
Collection of the Imperial War Museum
Books of interviews
British non-fiction books
Ebury Publishing books